The R. Sheppard Marble and Stone Works was a  Canadian monumental masonry firm active in nineteenth-century Ontario. It was run by R. Sheppard, a descendant of English settlers from Cheshire.

The company was located at 171 Queen Street in Toronto. In the nineteenth century, this firm produced gravestones. Carvers of gravestone were then known as marble manufacturers or marble cutters. Most of the names of the employees were lost, along with any records or collection of sepulchral designs. A few may be found listed in national or provincial directories, but their places of business have long since disappeared.

The company's address in Toronto no longer exists. "This number now lies approximately at the junction of Queen Street and University Avenue, an area of eight-lane divided macadam and massive granite buildings. The number 171 no longer exists”.

References

Companies based in Toronto
Canadian artist groups and collectives
Monumental masonry companies